Parliamentary elections were held in the Maldives on 9 May 2009.

Background
Political parties in the Maldives were legalised on 2 June 2005 after a unanimous vote in the Majlis which allowed a multi-party system to contest presidential and parliamentary elections after 30 years of autocratic rule by Maumoon Abdul Gayoom. On 28 October 2008, Mohamed Nasheed, leader of the Maldivian Democratic Party (MDP) defeated Gayoom in the country's democratic presidential elections. Following the election, Nasheed and Mohammed Waheed Hassan were sworn in as the President and Vice President on 11 November in a special session of the Majlis at the Dharubaaruge.

Electoral system
On 10 February 2009, the Majlis voted 36–0 (with one abstention) to pass the Parliamentary Constituencies Bill, which Nasheed signed into law later that day. It was the first act he signed as president after being inaugurated in November 2008. In the law, each administrative atoll's population determines how many electoral constituencies will be created. On 9 March 2009, the Elections Commission of the Maldives announced there were 214,405 eligible voters.

Results
The result in constituency N-02 Thimarafushi Dhaairaa was annulled due to irregularities and reported intimidation by the MDP at one polling region; polling was repeated on 11 July 2009. According to preliminary results, the MDP still won the seat.

References 

Maldives
Parliamentary election
Elections in the Maldives
May 2009 events in Asia
Election and referendum articles with incomplete results